The ascidian mitochondrial code (translation table 13) is a genetic code found in the mitochondria of Ascidia.

Code

   AAs  = FFLLSSSSYY**CCWWLLLLPPPPHHQQRRRRIIMMTTTTNNKKSSGGVVVVAAAADDEEGGGG
Starts = ---M------------------------------MM---------------M------------
 Base1 = TTTTTTTTTTTTTTTTCCCCCCCCCCCCCCCCAAAAAAAAAAAAAAAAGGGGGGGGGGGGGGGG
 Base2 = TTTTCCCCAAAAGGGGTTTTCCCCAAAAGGGGTTTTCCCCAAAAGGGGTTTTCCCCAAAAGGGG
 Base3 = TCAGTCAGTCAGTCAGTCAGTCAGTCAGTCAGTCAGTCAGTCAGTCAGTCAGTCAGTCAGTCAG

Bases: adenine (A), cytosine (C), guanine (G) and thymine (T) or uracil (U).

Amino acids: Alanine (Ala, A), Arginine (Arg, R), Asparagine (Asn, N), Aspartic acid (Asp, D), Cysteine (Cys, C), Glutamic acid (Glu, E), Glutamine (Gln, Q), Glycine (Gly, G), Histidine (His, H), Isoleucine (Ile, I), Leucine (Leu, L), Lysine (Lys, K), Methionine (Met, M), Phenylalanine (Phe, F), Proline (Pro, P), Serine (Ser, S), Threonine (Thr, T), Tryptophan (Trp, W), Tyrosine (Tyr, Y), Valine (Val, V)

Differences from the standard code

Systematic range and comments
There is evidence from a phylogenetically diverse sample of tunicates (Urochordata) that AGA and AGG code for glycine.  In other organisms, AGA/AGG code for either arginine or serine and in vertebrate mitochondria they code a STOP.  Evidence for glycine translation of AGA/AGG was first found in 1993 in Pyura stolonifera and Halocynthia roretzi. It was then confirmed by tRNA sequencing and sequencing whole mitochondrial genomes.

Alternative initiation codons
 ATA, GTG and TTG
 ATT is the start codon for the CytB gene in Halocynthia roretzi.

See also 
 List of genetic codes

References 

Molecular genetics
Gene expression
Protein biosynthesis